Alexander Breckinridge Merrie (20 May 1905 – 1985) was a Scottish footballer who played as a forward for 22 clubs.

References

1905 births
1985 deaths
Scottish footballers
Association football forwards
English Football League players
Saltcoats Victoria F.C. players
Nithsdale Wanderers F.C. players
St Mirren F.C. players
St Bernard's F.C. players
St Johnstone F.C. players
Alloa Athletic F.C. players
Stenhousemuir F.C. players
Portsmouth F.C. players
Aberdeen F.C. players
Ayr United F.C. players
Hull City A.F.C. players
Clyde F.C. players
Crewe Alexandra F.C. players
Brechin City F.C. players
Aldershot F.C. players
Ross County F.C. players
Exeter City F.C. players
Workington A.F.C. players
Cork F.C. players
Leith Athletic F.C. players
Gloucester City A.F.C. players